Betty & Coretta is a 2013 American drama film directed by Yves Simoneau and written by Shem Bitterman and Ron Hutchinson. The film stars Mary J. Blige, Angela Bassett, Gloria Reuben, Malik Yoba, Tyler Hynes and Benz Antoine. The film premiered on Lifetime on February 2, 2013.

Cast
Mary J. Blige as Dr. Betty Shabazz
Angela Bassett as Coretta Scott King
Gloria Reuben as Myrlie Evers-Williams
Malik Yoba as Martin Luther King Jr.
Tyler Hynes as Mike Fitzpatrick
Benz Antoine as Ralph Abernathy
Ruby Dee as Narrator
Cherise Boothe as Toni Wallace
Nicki Whitely as Attalah
Tristan D. Lalla as Jesse
Lindsay Owen Pierre as Malcolm X
Alex C. Askew as Louis Farrakhan

See also
 Civil rights movement in popular culture

References

External links
 

2010s American films
2010s English-language films
2013 biographical drama films
2013 films
2013 television films
African-American biographical dramas
African-American drama films
American drama television films
Civil rights movement in television
Coretta Scott King
Cultural depictions of Malcolm X
Cultural depictions of Martin Luther King Jr.
Films directed by Yves Simoneau
Lifetime (TV network) films